Gian Marco Schivo (born 6 May 1949) is a retired Italian high jumper.

Biography
He won the gold medal at the 1971 Mediterranean Games and finished seventeenth at the 1972 Olympic Games. His personal best jump is 2.17 metres, achieved in May 1972 in Rome.

His daughter Arianna Schivo competed at the 2016 Summer Olympics in equestrian.

References

External links
 

1949 births
Living people
Italian male high jumpers
Athletes (track and field) at the 1972 Summer Olympics
Olympic athletes of Italy
Mediterranean Games gold medalists for Italy
Athletes (track and field) at the 1971 Mediterranean Games
Mediterranean Games medalists in athletics